Montminy is a surname. Notable people with the surname include:

Anne Montminy (born 1975), Canadian diver and lawyer
Jean-Luc Montminy, Canadian actor
Jean-Pierre Montminy (1934–2017), Canadian military bandmaster and clarinetist
Tracy Montminy (1911–1992), American artist and muralist